"Tonight" was the second single released by The Rubettes from their debut album Wear It's 'At.  Written by Wayne Bickerton and Tony Waddington and produced by Bickerton, the single reached number 12 in the UK charts.

"Tonight" was one of the four demonstration recordings recorded by session musicians and singers in October 1973 which led to the formation of the Rubettes—the others being "Sugar Baby Love", "Juke Box Jive" and "Sugar Candy Kisses" (which became a hit for Mac and Katie Kissoon).

Charts

Later uses
 German singer Henner Hoier released a version of the song as a single in 1974
 French singer Philippe Leroy released a French lyrics version of the song as a single in 1974, entitled "Ce Soir" 
 Italian group La quinta faccia released the song as a single in 1975
 Swedish dance band Curt Haagers covered the song on their 1977 album My Symphony
 Belgian band Das Pop released the song as a promo single in 2000 and included it on their album I ♥

References

1974 singles
The Rubettes songs
Songs written by Wayne Bickerton
1974 songs
Songs written by Tony Waddington (songwriter)
Polydor Records singles